SparkyLinux is a desktop-oriented operating system based on the Debian operating system.
The project offers a ready to use operating system with various  desktops to choose from. SparkyLinux is released 3-4 times per year to provide the latest versions of all applications.

History
The project was born on October 2011 as an Ubuntu remix with Enlightenment as the default desktop having the name ue17r (Ubuntu Enlightenment17 Remix). After a few months of testing, the base system was changed to Debian and it was renamed to SparkyLinux.

Features
SparkyLinux is based on "stable" and "testing" branches of Debian and uses a 'rolling-release-cycle' (testing based only).
It includes a collection of tools and scripts to help users with easy administration of the system.

The default desktop environments are LXQt (former LXDE), MATE, Xfce and KDE, but users can install other desktops via 'Sparky APTus'.

As Sparky ISO image features a few proprietary packages, the 'Sparky APTus' provides a small tool called 'Non-Free Remover' which can easily uninstall all 'contrib' and 'non-free' packages from the system.

Since 2023, the project offers storage persistence from a utility which writes USB disk images. The feature so far only works on the MinimalGUI version of SparkyLinux.

Special editions 

 GameOver Edition, targeted to gamers. It features a large set of free and open-source games and some needed tools;
 Rescue Edition, provides a live system and a large number of applications for recovering broken operating systems;
 Multimedia for audio, video and html pages creating;
 MinimalCLI and MinimalGUI.

See also

 List of live CDs

References

Further reading

External links

 
 
 Sparky Linux at OpenSourceFeed

Debian-based distributions
Linux distributions
LiveDistro
Live USB
LXQt
Operating system distributions bootable from read-only media
X86-64 Linux distributions
Rolling Release Linux distributions